is a private university in Uji, Kyoto, Japan. The school's predecessor was founded in 1904. It was chartered as a junior college in 1960 and became a four-year college in 1996.

External links
 Official website 

Educational institutions established in 1904
Private universities and colleges in Japan
Universities and colleges in Kyoto Prefecture
1904 establishments in Japan